Victor Mine Aerodrome  is a registered aerodrome located  north of the Victor Diamond Mine in northeastern part of the Kenora District which, in turn, is located in northwestern Ontario, Canada.
 
The airstrip handles small to mid size turboprop aircraft. There are no hangars or terminal buildings and the airstrip is accessed by a gravel road from the Victor mine pit.

References

Registered aerodromes in Ontario